Todeschini may refer to:

 Bruno Todeschini (born 1962), Swiss actor
 Federico Todeschini (born 1975), Argentine rugby union footballer
 Federico Todeschini (economist) (born 1978), Argentine economist
 Jean-Marc Todeschini (born 1952), member of the Senate of France
 Paolo Todeschini (1920 – 1993), Italian professional footballer
 Giacomo Francesco Cipper, also known as Il Todeschini - Austrian-Italian still life painter